The equestrian statue of Frederick William, Elector of Brandenburg is a bronze equestrian statue installed outside Charlottenburg Palace in Berlin, Germany.

External links

 

Bronze sculptures in Germany
Equestrian statues in Germany
Statues in Berlin
Outdoor sculptures in Berlin
Sculptures of men in Germany
Statues of monarchs
Buildings and structures in Charlottenburg-Wilmersdorf
Charlottenburg